Cleveland is a village in Oswego County, New York, United States. The population was 750 at the 2010 census. The Village of Cleveland is located at the eastern boundary of the Town of Constantia on NY Route 49.

History 
The Village of Cleveland was incorporated in 1857. Much of the 19th century industry was based on glass manufacturing from the Cleveland Glass Company and the Union Glass Company.

During its existence, the New York Ontario and Western Railway ran through Cleveland. Some say the town is named after Cleveland, England and other claim it is named after James Cleveland, an early settler.

In 2007, over one hundred village residents signed a petition to dissolve the village.  The petition was rejected on technical grounds, but the village board formed a committee to study the implications of dissolution and alternatives, including increased efficiency via intermunicipal cooperation.

The St. James' Church was listed on the National Register of Historic Places in 1996.

Geography
Cleveland is located at  (43.236502, -75.882705).

The village is on the North Shore of Oneida Lake and on the border of Oneida County.

Demographics

As of the census of 2000, there were 758 people, 277 households, and 198 families residing in the village. The population density was 673.5 people per square mile (259.0/km2). There were 310 housing units at an average density of 275.4 per square mile (105.9/km2). The racial makeup of the village was 99.34% White, 0.13% African American, 0.13% Native American, 0.26% from other races, and 0.13% from two or more races. Hispanic or Latino of any race were 0.26% of the population.

There were 277 households, out of which 38.3% had children under the age of 18 living with them, 56.3% were married couples living together, 10.5% had a female householder with no husband present, and 28.5% were non-families. 22.0% of all households were made up of individuals, and 5.4% had someone living alone who was 65 years of age or older. The average household size was 2.74 and the average family size was 3.20.

In the village, the population was spread out, with 30.2% under the age of 18, 6.1% from 18 to 24, 31.9% from 25 to 44, 22.2% from 45 to 64, and 9.6% who were 65 years of age or older. The median age was 36 years. For every 100 females, there were 112.3 males. For every 100 females age 18 and over, there were 108.3 males.

The median income for a household in the village was $32,313, and the median income for a family was $42,250. Males had a median income of $30,739 versus $21,985 for females. The per capita income for the village was $15,366. About 9.6% of families and 12.4% of the population were below the poverty line, including 14.3% of those under age 18 and 5.6% of those age 65 or over.

Notable people
Eugenie Maria Morenus, mathematics professor at Sweet Briar College from 1909 to 1946; born in Cleveland
Geoff Roes⁣ – Elite Ultramarathon Runner Raised on the shores of Oneida Lake, Geoff attended Cleveland Elementary and went on to star in Track & Cross-Country for the Central Square Redmen before a brief but successful running career at Syracuse University.  Geoff owns course records in every 100-mile race he has ever run, as well as numerous course records and wins at distances ranging from 25 miles (ca. 40 km) to 100+.  Roes was the recipient of the 2009 Ultra Runner of the Year award.
Edward "Ned" Sherman, the first African American elected to serve as mayor in New York, was elected in Cleveland in 1878.
The incumbent mayor is Ms. Laureen Tackman. The incumbent Deputy Mayor is Ms. Christine Schreiber.

See also
 List of Villages in New York

References

External links
Official Website of The Village of Cleveland
Former Mayor Reehil's Webpage For The Village of Cleveland
 RootsWeb Page on Constantia, NY Area

Villages in New York (state)
Syracuse metropolitan area
Villages in Oswego County, New York